Upworthy is a website dedicated to positive storytelling. It was started in March 2012 by Eli Pariser, the former executive director of MoveOn, and Peter Koechley, the former managing editor of The Onion. One of Facebook's co-founders, Chris Hughes, was an early investor. In 2017, the company was acquired by Good Worldwide. Between the two platforms, they reached 100MM people a month.

Upworthy's stated mission is "to change what the world pays attention to."

History
In June 2013, an article in Fast Company called Upworthy "the fastest growing media site of all time".

In August 2013 the site became the first "non-traditional" site to feature in NewsWhip's Top Ten Publisher Rankings, in fifth place. By November 2013 they were the third most social publisher on Facebook, despite their low article count.

The site popularized a style of two-phrase headlines. It has been criticized for its use of overly sensationalized, emotionally manipulative, "clickbait" style, headlines as well as having a liberal bias, and simplifying issues that are controversial by nature.

Since 2015, under the site's new editorial director, Amy O'Leary (who joined the site from The New York Times in February 2015) it has been focussing more on producing original content, rather than aggregating third-party content. This resulted in six of its staff being laid off, as well as new staff being hired.

Upworthy was accused of laying off one round of writers in 2015, and another in 2016, after an unionization effort by some of the staff. The union involved, the Writers Guild of America, East, has organized several online "viral" news publishers.

In January 2017, Upworthy was acquired by Good Worldwide, a company that similarly focused on spreading progressive messages through their websites such as good.is. The newsrooms of the two organizations would merge as part of the acquisition. About 20 staffers were laid off as part of the merger. An October 2017 article in AdExchanger described the merger as successful in helping the joint entity achieve profitability.

Funding
Upworthy has been through two rounds of funding. In October 2012 it raised $4 million from New Enterprise Associates and other angel investors, including BuzzFeed co-founder John Johnson, Facebook co-founder and New Republic owner Chris Hughes, and Reddit co-founder Alexis Ohanian.

Content
Upworthy writers and video staff produce daily stories, which are distributed on social media. Topics include "Being a Better Human," "Citizenship & Democracy," "Culture," "Identities," and "Science & Technology."

Views
In November 2013, Upworthy hit a high of over 80 million unique visitors for the month. However, in early 2014 it had fallen to roughly 20 million unique visitors. As of December 2014, Upworthy's mission statement says it engages a total of about 50 million people each month.

As of October 2016, Upworthy's YouTube channel has 157,370 subscribers and has had over 10 million views. By October 2018 the channel had 163,154 subscribers and over 14 million views.

Advertising
Upworthy has been labeled a "clickbait shop"; however, for two years, Upworthy did not monetize clicks through display advertising. The company began making money in April 2014 with the announcement of Upworthy Collaborations.

, Upworthy also relies on traditional advertising with AdSense.

Upworthy Collaborations is a name given to Upworthy's advertising partnerships with corporations. It includes native ads, and articles that its advertising partners underwrite. It is selective with the organizations it collaborates with and states that "We draw a line on greenwashing".  Upworthy states that it wishes to work with corporations who have a common mission and similar values.  Peter Koechley said on the topic: "We won’t take an ad from Exxon claiming to be good for the environment, but Skype claiming they help people communicate—that seems about right". It has attracted prominent brands such as Unilever, Skype, CoverGirl, and charities such as the Bill and Melinda Gates Foundation.

See also

Mashable

References

Social media
Internet properties established in 2012
American news websites
2012 establishments in New York City